Ze'ev Bielski (born 13 March 1949) is an Israeli politician who served as a member of the Knesset for Kadima between 2009 and 2013. He previously chaired the Jewish Agency and the World Zionist Organization and worked as a Jewish Agency emissary in South Africa. He also served as the mayor of Ra'anana (served 1989–2005, 2013–2018). Bielski is a founder of The Israel Forum, whose purpose is to maintain a direct relationship between young Jews from the Diaspora and Israel in the areas of education and economy. He also played in the Israeli national basketball league.

Biography

Early life

Bielski was born and raised in Jerusalem. Between 1967 and 1970 he served in the IDF, where he reached the level of Major. He earned a BA in economics at the Hebrew University of Jerusalem.

Public life
Between 1977 and 1980 he was the leading Jewish Agency emissary in South Africa. In 1989, after coming back to Israel, he became the Mayor of Ra'anana. During his mayorship, he also served as the Deputy Chairman of the Union of Local Authorities in Israel between 1996 and 1999, and as the National Chairman of the anti-drug organization, "Al-Sam" from 1994 to 1996.

On 23 June 2005 he was elected a member of the World Zionist Organization Council as a member of Herut – The National Movement. On 28 June he succeeded Salai Meridor as the chairman of the Jewish Agency. His candidacy for this position was supported by Ariel Sharon.

Prior to the 2009 elections he was placed 15th on the Kadima list, and entered the Knesset as the party won 28 seats. He chose not to run in the 2013 elections.

Private life
Ze'ev Bielski is married to Caron Sacks (sister of art collector Leslie Sacks; and sister of American businessman Rodney Sacks), whom he met in South Africa. They have 3 children, 2 girls (Adi and Tali) and a boy (Eran).

School Funding
Bielski has resisted calls from constituents to fund schools that fall outside of mainstream schemes. In 2011, local residents sought approval to establish a Ra'anana branch of the Pelech School as an alternative for girls to the city's beleaguered Amit "Renanim". He has been criticized by Rabbi Michael Melchior, a founder of Meitarim, a network of pluralistic Jewish schools in Israel that educate religious and secular students together, for his refusal to provide city funding to the local branch of the pluralistic school.

American Jews
Bielski told The Jerusalem Post that Jews in America have no future in America. Due to the size of America he believes assimilation is inevitable, and all Jews in America should move to Israel.

References

External links

Biography Jewish Agency

1949 births
People from Jerusalem
Israeli Jews
Hebrew University of Jerusalem Faculty of Social Sciences alumni
Mayors of Ra'anana
Members of the 18th Knesset (2009–2013)
Living people
Kadima politicians
Heads of the Jewish Agency for Israel
Sacks family